The Escuela Nacional de Bellas Artes (ENBA, or National School of Fine Arts) is the main center of education and training of artists in the Republic of Honduras.

History

Precursors 
On 15 April 1878, the first precursor to the ENBA was registered in this field with the establishment of a school for drawing and painting located in Tegucigalpa; the Academy of Fine Arts and Applied Drawing to the Industrial Arts was created in 1890, founded and directed by Tomás Mur, of Spanish nationality. The National Academy of Drawing Claroscuro al Natual was created in 1934 under the direction of Carlos Zúñiga Figueroa, and by 1938, the School of Arts and Crafts emerged. In that same year, the section of Artistic Drawing is opened, that suggested the creation of the National School of Fine Arts.

The School of Fine Arts 
The National School of Fine Arts (ENBA) was founded in 1940 by the President of the Republic, Doctor and General Tiburcio Carias Andino.

Carias Andino awarded the artists Arturo López Rodezno, Maximiliano Ramírez Euceda, Samuel Salgado, and Salvador Posadas, since a year before through a government mandate, the creation of a School of Arts; these artists had themselves proposed the creation of such school in accordance with the president. The same year they were located in the arts building of the ENBA, street 6, Avenue 2 and 3, in front of La Libertad park in Comayagüela, Central District. In its beginnings, the students of the National School of Fine Arts (ENBA) received drawing, painting, and sculpture classes; some models that were painted came in its majority from Europe and captured by the students in a canvas mounted on an easel.

Mission 
The ENBA is an educational institution that offers specialized services in the visual arts at middle level, formal and non-formal; to contribute with the development of Honduran plastic arts, the appreciation of art, national and universal culture.

Vision 
The ENBA considers itself as a leading institution in the artistic-visual formation in every level of the National Educational System, promoting the different manifestations of the visual arts and cultures through the activities of teaching, investigation, and extension. Regarding their policies of cultural, academic growth and support for the teaching-learning process, the following are proposed goals in the short, medium, and long term: specify a process of reform that defines the administrative and academic regulations. Establish a mechanism of financial self-management to strengthen the academic process and cultural extension of the institution. To formulate and push a proposal for the creation of a bachelor's degree in the career of Visual Arts with different specialties. To achieve the construction of a new building that houses the facilities of what will be the New School of Fine Arts and the creation of an interactive-didactic Museum of the visual arts.

Historical and legal issues 
In 1940, the National School of Fine Arts is created, ascribed to the Ministry of Development, Commerce and Industry, offering courses and diplomas to the graduates of the sixth grade in the modalities of: drawing, perspective, paint, sculpture, ceramic, wood carving and religious sculpture, studied in five years.

In 1953, the school became part of the Ministry of Education. In 1956, the Plan for Bachelors and Professors of Primary Education was created, granting the title of Teacher of Drawing and Modeling, that is done in two years. This plan of studies disappeared in 1965.

In 1966, the Plan of Teacher of Plastic Arts initiated for graduates of the common cycle of General Culture. This modality replaced the one of Teacher of Drawing and Modeling and was extended until the year of 1975; in this same year the agreement of Legalization of Titles and Diplomas granted since 1940 was issued.

In 1976, the National School of Fine Arts is created by law and that same year, the Master Plan in Plastic Arts is created, that worked until 2005. In 1980, the bachelor's degree in graphic arts was created. In 1993, the Plastic Arts Plan for baccalaureates began, which is currently in place. In 2003, the Bachelor of Science with Orientation in Plastic Education was created within the framework of the Transformation of the National Schools, replacing the above mentioned Master Plan in Plastic Arts.

Institutional frame 1940 – 2014 
The National School of Fine Arts is an educational public institution of plastic-artistic training of medium level, unique in its genre and academic degree. Depends on the Secretary of Education through the Departmental Direction of Education of Francisco Morazán, and the District Direction No. 9. Its curricula was composed of three modalities of study at a diversified level:

 1. Bachelor's degree in Plastic Arts.
 2. Bachelor's degree in Graphic Arts.
 3. Bachelor's degree in Cultural Management.

In the framework of the non-formal education it offers the following modalities:

 1. Free courses of Artistic Training.
 2. Drawing courses and Infantile Painting.

This educational center, in its trajectory, has been very important in Honduran society because of its contribution to the development of visual arts and national culture. It has formed more than 90% of the creators, observers, and educators of art.

Academy 
The formal academic activity is done through three modalities of study.

Bachelor's degree in Plastic Arts: This plan of studies aims to endow its students of the basic and practical theoretical-artistic knowledge that allow them the elaboration of the work of art, aiming that the students become the representative artists of the national plastic arts. In addition to training them as professionals in this field, it prepares them to face their future personal challenges, of participation in society, and the ability of participating in higher studies. The aspects on which this plan is based are aesthetic creativity, plastic artistic promoter, human relations and professional ethics, critical judgement, national identity, and democratic attitude.

Bachelor's degree in Graphic Arts: This plan aims to provide to its students of technical-artistic and scientific knowledge that allows them to develop as professionals in the field of visual communication performing as graphic designers. It also forms them in the scientific-humanist area, which will enable them to opt for higher studies.

School teaching in Plastic Arts: plan of studies that aims to provide its students of pedagogical, artistic, and scientific knowledge to initiate them in the development of necessary skills in the teaching of plastic art, besides preparing them to continue with higher studies in this field. Through these study modalities since year 1977 until 2006, they have graduated 1,034 young people coming from the different departments of the country. In the established study modalities in the 1957 to 1976 period graduated 154 young people, making a total of 1,188 professionals in this field.

Curricular reforms specific in educational training 

The ENBA designs and executes curricular models in response to social demands and to specific historical moments. In the first years of its operation, the ENBA offers courses and diplomas to sixth grade graduates in the modalities or sections of: drawing, perspective, painting, sculpture, decoration, ceramic, carving in wood, and religious sculpture. These were developed with a duration of five years.

By 1956, the Plan for Bachelors and Teachers of Primary Education was created. Giving them the title of Teacher of Drawing and Modeling, this plan was completed in two years. In 1966, the Teacher of Plastic Arts was initiated for graduates of the common cycle of General Culture, this modality replaced to one of Teacher of Drawing and Modeling and extends to the year 1975. This plan was completed in three years. In 1976, the plan of Teachers of Plastic Arts was initiated, which worked until 2005. In 1975, the agreement of Legalization of Titles and Diplomas granted from 1940 until 1975 was issued, and it was "created" by law the National School of Fine Arts, ascribed to the Executive Department of Artistic and Normal.

In 2003, the Bachelor's Degree of Sciences with Orientation in Plastic Education (BEP in Spanish) in the framework of the reforms of the normal and artistic education, presented by the Secretary of Education. This process lasted only five years.

In 2008 under the agreement 1710- SE-2008, started again teacher training under the Teachers of Primary Education in Plastic Arts, which was completed in a three-year period, running to date. Since 2005, this institution has aimed to elevate the formation of its modalities of studies on a higher level.

In 2015, bachelor's conversion to Professional Technician bachelor in three fields or areas initiates; B.T.P on Design, B.T.P on Cultural and Educational Management, and B.T.P in Plastic Arts.

Cultural work 
The National School of Fine arts, makes the following events.

* Annual exhibitions of visual arts of his students, graduates, and invited guests.

* Ensenarte Project.

* Academic travels.

* Preparation of artistic projects in the frame of Social Educational Works.

* Technical Practices and Professional Practices.

* Develop Workshops of plastic qualifications to educators.

* Preparation and publication of magazine, manual. Educational texts and didactic material.

* Participation in two meetings of plastic artists to Latin American and worldwide level.

* Organization and development of conferences on subjects of Art, Culture and Social dictated by well-known plastic artists, sociologists and national and international writers.

* Participation in exhibitions and contests to national and international level.

* Form part of the Jury of the National Prize of Art, Pablo Zelaya. Form part of the Jury of different biennials to thnational level.

* Creation and awarding of Prize ITZAMNA, over a period of six consecutive years. Organisation of three meetings of national and international artists.

* Collaboration in the organisation and setting of the Biennial of the Autonomous National University of Honduras, the Honduran Institute of Inter-American Culture, IHCI and the Anthology of the Plastic Arts.

* Demonstrations in public places of the country of the processes of the preparation of the artistic work.

National prize of Art Itzamná 
It is the national prize that awards this school of arts to the stood out national artists that manage in his respective disciplines. 
 Delivered to the writer Eduardo Bähr, in 1981 in branch of Literature.
 Delivered to the director of cinema Sami Kafati in 1982 for being the pioneer in Honduras, in the cinematography with his work fílmica "My Fellow Ángel".
 Delivered to the writer José Adán Castelar, in 1982 in branch of Literature.
 Delivered to the writer Rigoberto Walls, in 1983 in the branch of Literature.
 Delivered to the writer Marcos Carías Zapata, in 1984 in branch of Literature.

Teachers of the And.N.B.To. 
Between the teachers of the And.N.B.To. They stand out Alfredo Ruiz Barrier, Arturo López Rodezno, Carlos Zuñiga Figueroa, Carlos Garay, Dante Lazzaroni Andean, José Rony Castle, Horace Reina, Mario M. Castle, Mario Mejía Turcios, Maximiliano Ramírez Euceda, Pablo Zelaya Sierra, Raúl Fiallos, Teresa Victoria Fortín Franco, and Pastor Sabillón Fernández among others.

Inside a new generation of artists and educational that acuerpan the school encontramosBlas Aguilar, Gabriel Zaldibar, Víctor López, Oscar Mendoza, Víctor Hugo Cruz, Gilberto Videz, Teresa Silva, Marcia Ney Rivera, Delmer Mejia, Antonio Baquedano, Luis Enrique Cruz, Juan Sunday Torres Q.D.D.G., Ernesto Argueta, Luci Martínez, Rafael Cáceres, Daniel Rivera, Kelvin Kings, Medardo Cardona, among others.

Graduates of the And.N.B.To. 
Between the artists graduated in the And.N.B.To. They stand out Álvaro Channels, Ánibal Cruz,  Armando Lara, Mario Zamora Alcantara, Miguel Ángel Ruiz Matute, Moses Becerra, Nury Reina of Toffe, Ricardo Aguilar, Virgil To. Guardiola, Leonel Benítez Efraín, Jesús Antonio Zelaya, Arturo Moon, Delmer Mejía, Luis Hernán Padilla, Ezequiel Padilla Ayestas, Julio Visquerra, Margarita Velásquez, Dino Mario Fanconi Moncada, Isabel Membreño, Hermes Armijo Maletz, José Joaquín Urquía García and Francis Spanish of Ayala, Patricia Toledo Bautista,  among others.

Actuality of the National School of Fine arts 
The National School of Fine arts (And. N. B. To.) survive with a small support of institutions and of the government, although his greater contribution to continue existing, bases  in the fees paid by students.

Initiated in the anniversary of the 50 years of the school, of 1990 to the 2007, the National School of Fine arts together with the Cultural Centre of Spain in Tegucigalpa and the Office of Culture, Arts and Sports, summoned each 15 November the Anthology of the Plastic and Visual Arts of Honduras for incentivar and document the annual creativity, as well as improve the social projection of the And.N.B.To. Equally, every year it surrendered homage to a teacher of the plastic Honduran.

In the 2009 the number of alumni was of 260 students and it went to lower levels in 2015, when National School of Fine arts only has 236 students, in spite of the scholarships and helps awarded.

Careers 
The institution offers artistic degrees that are a combination of art type and academic level.
 Teaching Degree for Visual Arts
 Bachelor In Graphic Arts
 Bachelor In Visual Arts
 Bachelor Professional Technician of Visual Artistic Design
 Bachelor Professional Technician of Visual Arts
 Bachelor In Humanities with Focus in Visual Arts Education

Budget 
The government of Honduras decided to invest an additional 18 billion Lempiras (US$933 million) between 2001 and 2015, towards social projects in education, health and culture amounting to 35% of the budget for the reducing poverty strategy.

This investment is one more component of the already decided and pre-established budget for these sectors, something the government has not made, instead maintaining the National School of Fine Arts working with a lowered budget and as of the date of May, 2014 has not delivered the 2013 budget, besides the scholarship of $15/month assigned for each student in school. Art has been ignored in Honduras, for example the maximum prize that a national artist can aspire to win is the National Prize of Art Pablo Zelaya Sierra, which only has an annual monetary reward of US$500 to the first place.

See also 
 Art in Honduras
 National prize of Art Pablo Zelaya Sierra
 Painting of Honduras
 Culture of Honduras
 Education in Honduras
 History of the Education in Honduras
 Annex:Teachers of the National School of Fine arts (Honduras)
 Annex:Artists graduated in National School of Fine arts (Honduras)

References 

Honduran culture
History of Honduras
Education in Honduras
Educational institutions established in 1940
1940 establishments in Honduras